Fung Kong Tsuen is a village in Ha Tsuen, Yuen Long District, Hong Kong.

Administration
Fung Kong Tsuen is a recognized village under the New Territories Small House Policy.

History
At the time of the 1911 census, the population of Fung Kong Tsuen was 76. The number of males was 34.

References

External links

 Delineation of area of existing village Fung Kong Tsuen (Ha Tsuen) for election of resident representative (2019 to 2022)

Villages in Yuen Long District, Hong Kong
Ha Tsuen
Lau Fau Shan